The 2009 Senior League World Series took place from August 16–22 in Bangor, Maine, United States. Houston, Texas defeated Fremont, California in the championship game.

Teams

Results

Group A

Group B

Elimination Round

References

Senior League World Series
Senior League World Series
2009 in sports in Maine